Hypostomus macrophthalmus is a species of catfish in the family Loricariidae. It is native to South America, where it occurs in the Sipaliwini River basin in Suriname. The species reaches  in standard length and is believed to be a facultative air-breather.

References 

macrophthalmus